Itigi District is a district council in the Singida Region of central Tanzania established in 2015. The district lies in the south-western portion of the Singida Region with 123,515 people and encompasses a large area mostly made up of protected game reserves.

History 

The district was created by separation of the town of Itigi and its division from the Manyoni District on the 25th of September, 2015.

Geography 

North of the district is the Ikungi District, east is the Manyoni District, south is the Chunya District of the Mbeya Region, and to the west are the Uyui and Sikonge Districts of the Tabora Region.

Climate 

The district's climate is hot semi-arid with the BSh Koppen-Geiger system classification.

Flora and fauna 

The Itigi–Sumbu thicket is two small patches of isolated thickets located in the Itigi District of Tanzania, and in Zambia near Lake Mweru Wantipa and Lake Tanganyika.

Administrative 

The district has one division, 13 wards, 39 villages, and 171 hamlets.

Wards (2016 Population)

 Aghondi (6,000)
 Idodyandole (12,291)
 Ipande (11,017)
 Itigi (6,134)
 Itigi Majengo (12,431)
 Kalangali (5,241)
 Kitaraka (10,656)
 Mgandu (15,129)
 Mitundu (20,086)
 Mwamagembe (7,091)
 Rungwa (2,424)
 Sanjaranda (9,687)
 Tambukareli (5,331)

Demographics 

In 2016 the Tanzania National Bureau of Statistics report there were 123,515 people in the district, from 112,565 in 2012. People of the district are of the tribes of Wagogo, Waturu, Wanyaturu, Wasukuma, Wanyamwezi, and Wakimbu.

Economy 

Agriculture and livestock raising are the primary economic activities, along with trade, beekeeping and gypsum mining.

In the 2018/19 year the Itigi District produced 16,807 metric tons of maize, 2,466.5 tonnes of sorghum, 7,027 tonnes of sweet potatoes, and 2,295 tonnes of finger millet. The Mgandu Ward has  of potential irrigation land under the Itagata Irrigation Scheme for paddy.

For grazing, the district has  with  being used, and a small amount of  infected with Tsetse fly. In 2019 the Itigi had 108,020 cattle, 62,403 chickens, 857 ducks, 51,314 goats, 1,155 pigs, and 13,637 sheep as livestock.

Education 

There are 67 primary schools, and 12 secondary schools in the district. In 2019, 7 of the secondary schools had electricity, of which 3 are connected to the grid and 4 use solar power.

Health 

There are two health centers, and 18 clinics in the district. In 2018, 42% of the population had access to clean water.

Infrastructure

Roads 

Rail 

There is currently a station in use on the Central Line. A new station for the under construction Tanzania Standard Gauge Railway is being built in Itigi.

References 

Singida Region
Districts of Singida Region
Constituencies of Tanzania